The 2001 Kent State Golden Flashes football team was an American football team that represented Kent State University in the Mid-American Conference (MAC) during the 2001 NCAA Division I-A football season. In their fourth season under head coach Dean Pees, the Golden Flashes compiled a 6–5 record (5–3 against MAC opponents), finished in a tie for fourth place in the MAC East, and were outscored by all opponents by a combined total of 281 to 248.

The team's statistical leaders included Josh Cribbs with 1,019 rushing yards and 1,516 passing yards and Jurron Kelly with 479 receiving yards.

Schedule

References

Kent State
Kent State Golden Flashes football seasons
Kent State Golden Flashes football